The 1980 CONMEBOL Pre-Olympic Tournament began on 23 January and ended on 15 February 1980 and was the 7th CONMEBOL Pre-Olympic Tournament. Ecuador, Paraguay and Uruguay did not participate. Argentina and Colombia qualified for the 1980 Summer Olympics.

References 

CONMEBOL Pre-Olympic Tournament
1980 in association football
1980 in South American football